The Pico Agudo (Portuguese: 'acute peak') is a peak near the Brazilian municipality of Sapopema, Paraná. It is  West of Sapopema, overlooking the valley of the Tibagi River,  North and downstream of the Mauá Hydroelectric Plant.

It was surveyed between 1920 and 1930 by Reinhard Maack, one of the first geologists to explore the region, who made a geological survey of the Tibagi River valley.

References

Sources
 

Landforms of Paraná (state)